"Hooray for Hollywood" is a popular song first featured in the 1937 movie Hollywood Hotel, and which has since become (together with "That's Entertainment" and "There's No Business like Show Business") the staple soundtrack element of any Academy Awards ceremony. It is even frequently played during non-American movie ceremonies, e.g. the French César Awards. The popularity of the song is notably due to the lyrics by Johnny Mercer, which reference the American movie industry and satirize the illusory desire of many people to become famous as actors.

Composition 
The music was composed by Richard A. Whiting. In the original movie it was sung by Johnnie Davis and Frances Langford, accompanied by Benny Goodman and his orchestra.

Its lyrics can be difficult to fully understand today, as they refer to people (e.g. Aimee Semple) or cultural elements (e.g. rotos) which have since been largely forgotten. The lyrics have also evolved over the years. Notably, the line "where any shopgirl can be a top girl, if she pleases the tired businessman" vanished quite quickly, and is absent from the 1958 Doris Day version, having been replaced with "and any barmaid can be a star made if she dances with or without a fan" The latter part of the line refers to Sally Rand and her fan dance. Today the song is performed mostly as a melody.

Usage 
 The song is used in the opening scene of the Looney Tunes cartoon What's Up, Doc? (1950). 
 The melody was used on the Jack Benny radio show as the final theme song.
 The song is played over the opening and closing shots of Robert Altman's film The Long Goodbye (1973) starring Elliott Gould as Philip Marlowe.
In 1977, the song was performed twice during an episode of The Brady Bunch Variety Hour. Some lyrics were altered to reference then-current pop-culture ("If you find things get rough, you could get Pufnstuf..." and "...where any person like Laverne or Shirley or Jo Anne Worley is equally understood").
 The song is featured in the musical A Day in Hollywood/A Night in the Ukraine.
 The song was used as the opening and exit to Disney-MGM Studios' The Great Movie Ride attraction. This version became one of the many California related songs played throughout "Sunshine Plaza" in the original Disney's California Adventure.
 Jay Leno on the Tonight Show often did take-offs of Rodney Dangerfield's schtick, telling bandleader Kevin Eubanks; "Kevin, the economy is so bad that..." After the punchline, the Tonight Show Band played a fast melody of "Hooray for Hollywood".
 In the Disney Channel original movie Phantom of The Megaplex Mickey Rooney’s character “Movie Mason” sings the tail end of the song in front of the theatre for the premiere of the movie. 
 In The Simpsons episode "Mayored to the Mob", the cast members of a production of Guys and Dolls sing a song with the musical's title to the tune of "Hooray for Hollywood", which, as the show's star Mark Hamill points out, isn't actually one of that show's musical numbers.
 A cha-cha instrumental version of the song was used as bumper music for David Feeney's short-lived "Hollywood Minute" segment on the popular podcast Daves of Thunder.
 A simplified score of the melody decorates the banisters in the Hollywood/Vine Red Line Station in Los Angeles leading down to the platform.
 Rock band Hollywood Undead sample the Doris Day version of this song in their live pre-set introduction.
 The song is used in the opening of Warren Beatty's film Rules Don't Apply (2016).
 The song is used in Ray Donovan Episodes 01 - Season 1 "The Bag or the Bat" (2013) with the Doris Day version.
 The song is performed in the 1978 film Sextette starring 87-year-old Mae West, which was her final film.

See also 
 "There's No Business Like Show Business"
 "That's Entertainment!"
 "Make 'Em Laugh"

References

External links 
 
 Film clip at tcm.com
 Lyrics at johnnymercer.com

Songs about actors
Songs about Los Angeles
Songs written for films
Songs with music by Richard A. Whiting
Songs with lyrics by Johnny Mercer
Doris Day songs
Academy Awards
Benny Goodman songs